Cheon Yanghui (born January 21, 1942) is a South Korean poet, best known for her poetry collection Sorghum Field of the Heart (1994).

Life
Cheon Yanghui was born in Busan on 21 January 1942 as the youngest of seven children. Throughout her childhood she was heavily influenced by her father, an enthusiast of poetry and pansori, and by her grandfather, a lay Buddhist. She often wrote and recited poems, despite being unable to participate in art festivals due to administrative issues at her school. In 1962 Cheon enrolled in Ewha Womans University, graduating with a degree in Korean literature.

Career
Cheon Yanghui's career followed an unusual trajectory in that she began publishing in her 20s, stopped for nearly two decades, then resumed publishing poetry in her 40s, to great critical acclaim. Her literary debut was in 1965, when the prestigious literary magazine Hyundae Munhak published three of her poems - "Once in a Garden", "Harmony", and "Morning" - thanks to a recommendation from Pak Dujin. After Cheon Yanghui married in 1969, she stopped writing and publishing poetry, although she eventually divorced her husband and became the manager of a dressmaker's shop. During this time she also suffered from tuberculosis and a heart condition. In 1983 Cheon returned to poetry by publishing the collection If God Asks Us.

While many of Cheon Yanghui's earlier works reflect on an isolated self, more of her later poems - beginning with her most well-known poetry collection Sorghum Field of the Heart (1994) - focus more on the everyday hardships, sorrows, and frustrations of living a more "typical" life. From her more mature perspective, Cheon was able to write eloquently about what insights she had learned over the past several decades of her life. More recent publications, such as Too Many Mouths (2005), further elaborate on her perspective of what it means to write and publish poetry in modern society.

Cheon Yanghui has received the Sowol Poetry Prize, the Contemporary Literature (Hyundae Munhak) Award, Gong Cho Literature Award, Pak Dujin Literary Award, and Manhae Literature Prize.

Works

Poetry collections
 If God Asks Us (1984)
 Sorghum Field of the Heart (1994)
 Old Alley (1998)
 Too Many Mouths (2005)
 Sometimes I Stand Motionless (2011)

Essay collections
 Into Jikso Fall (2004)
 Strolling in the Forest of Poetry (2006)
 When in Desperation, We Always Kneel Down (2013)
 I Am a Wind That Does Not Howl (2014)
 Writing Class (2015)

Works in translation
 Poems in Korean Literature Today Vol 4, No 4, Winter, 1999
 Poems in  Vol 59

Awards
 1996: Sowol Poetry Prize - for "Fastening Buttons"
 1998: Contemporary Literature (Hyundae Munhak) Award - for "Old Alley" and four others
 2005: Gong Cho Literature Prize
 2007: Pak Dujin Literary Award
 2011: Han Yong-un Literature Prize

Further reading
 Yi Sukja. "The Imagery of Roads and Birds in Cheong Yanghui's Poetry." Master's Thesis, Korea University, 2005. , 2005.
 Kang Jiryeong. "The Buddhist Worldview in Cheong Yanghui's Poetry - Focusing on the Relationship Between the Self and the World." Master's Thesis, Graduate School, Inje University, 2005. , 2005.
 Bang Minho. "The Long Road to Embracing the World: Review of Cheon Yanghui's Sorghum Field of the Heart." Korea Poem, April 1997. , 1997.4.
 Kim Seontae. "Radiant Flowers of Life Blooming on Scars: A Discussion on Cheon Yanghui." Korean Language and Literature, June 2002. , 2002.6.
 Pak Monggu. "Returning from Nihility and Poets on Desire - Cheong Yanghui's Poetry and the Structure of Desire." Eomunyeongu, April 2004. , 2004.4.
 Jo Haeok. "A Unique Pattern of Life: Review of Too Many Mouths by Cheon Yanghui." Korea Poem, July 2005. , 2005.7.
 "Cheon Yanghui" in Dictionary of Korean Women Writers (2006), quoted in Naver. Encyclopedia. [네이버 )

References

External links 
 Poetry reading
 Interview

1942 births
Ewha Womans University alumni
21st-century South Korean poets
People from Busan
Living people
South Korean women poets
20th-century South Korean poets
20th-century South Korean women writers
21st-century South Korean women writers
Yeongyang Cheon clan